Bellman's lost-in-a-forest problem is an unsolved minimization problem in geometry, originating in 1955 by the American applied mathematician Richard E. Bellman.  The problem is often stated as follows: "A hiker is lost in a forest whose shape and dimensions are precisely known to him. What is the best path for him to follow to escape from the forest?" It is usually assumed that the hiker does not know the starting point or direction he is facing. The best path is taken to be the one that minimizes the worst-case distance to travel before reaching the edge of the forest. Other variations of the problem have been studied. 

Although real world applications are not apparent, the problem falls into a class of geometric optimization problems including search strategies that are of practical importance. A bigger motivation for study has been the connection to Moser's worm problem. It was included in a list of 12 problems described by the mathematician Scott W. Williams as "million buck problems" because he believed that the techniques involved in their resolution will be worth at least a million dollars to mathematics.

Approaches
A proven solution is only known for a few shapes or classes of shape. A general solution would be in the form of a geometric algorithm which takes the shape of the forest as input and returns the optimal escape path as the output.

References

Metric geometry
Discrete geometry
Unsolved problems in geometry
Recreational mathematics